Zachary David Liew Vui Keong (Pha̍k-fa-sṳ: Liù Vî-khiòng; 18 January 1960 – 2 October 2020) was a Malaysian politician who served as the Minister in the Prime Minister's Department in charge of legal affairs in the Pakatan Harapan (PH) administration under former Prime Minister Mahathir Mohamad from July 2018 to the collapse of the PH administration in February 2020 and Deputy Minister in the Prime Minister's Department also in charge of legal affairs as well as Deputy Minister of International Trade and Industry I in the Barisan Nasional (BN) administration under former Prime Ministers Abdullah Ahmad Badawi and Najib Razak from March 2008 to May 2013. He also served as the Member of Parliament (MP) for Batu Sapi from May 2018 to his death in October 2020 and for Sandakan from March 2008 to his defeat in May 2013. He served as 3rd President of the Liberal Democratic Party (LDP) from 2006 to 2014, when he was replaced by Teo Chee Kang in a rancorous internal dispute. He disputed Teo's claim of the LDP party presidency with the Registrar of Societies (RoS). In 2018, Liew led about 200 LDP members to leave the party. He then joined another Sabah-based political party, Sabah Heritage Party (WARISAN) led by former Chief Minister of Sabah Shafie Apdal and served as its Permanent Chairman.

On 2 October 2020, Liew died at the age of 60 from pneumonia while being treated for a slipped disc.

Political career

Criticism over ESSCOM 
In 2016, Liew criticised the Eastern Sabah Security Command (ESSCOM) and said it is a "complete failure" especially with the continuous abduction and urging the security council should sit down with the stakeholders and lay out their weaknesses, including a need for a complete revamp of their standard operating procedures and how to deal with pirates and militant groups.

Capital punishment abolishment 

Following the formation of a new Malaysian government and his subsequent appointment as a Minister in the Prime Minister's Department on law matters in 2018, he stated that the new Malaysia's government was planning to abolish the mandatory capital punishment for all situations including for serious crimes, which later has been heavily opposed by many organisations and social groups in the country who were against a total abolition of the capital punishment due to the already high level of serious crimes.

Controversy

LDP's legal tangle 
Liew had sacked 23 out of the 35 supreme council members as party members demanded top two positions to be contested. He was subsequently removed from his presidency post and was replaced by the sacked Secretary General Teo Chee Kang for his act of abuse of power in an attempt to consolidate his position as president. Liew's appeal to the Court of appeal over his removal from the presidency post was dismissed.

Elections

2013 general election 
In the 2013 election, Liew faced Wong Tien Fatt of Democratic Action Party (DAP) and lost his parliamentary seat.

2018 general election 
In the 2018 election, Liew was fielded as a candidate by his new party of WARISAN to contest the Batu Sapi parliamentary seat. He successfully won the seat by defeating Linda Tsen Thau Lin of United Sabah Party (PBS).

Election results

Honours

Honours of Malaysia
  :
  Commander of the Order of Kinabalu (PGDK) - Datuk (2006)

References 

1960 births
2020 deaths
People from Kota Belud District
Malaysian people of Hakka descent
Malaysian politicians of Chinese descent
Presidents of Liberal Democratic Party (Malaysia)
Sabah Heritage Party politicians
Members of the Dewan Rakyat
Government ministers of Malaysia
Commanders of the Order of Kinabalu
Deaths from pneumonia in Malaysia
21st-century Malaysian politicians
People from Sandakan